The Department of Education, Science and Training (also called DEST) was an Australian government department that existed between November 2001 and December 2007.

Scope
Information about the department's functions and/or government funding allocation could be found in the Administrative Arrangements Orders, the annual Portfolio Budget Statements, in the Department's annual reports and on the Department's website.

According to the Administrative Arrangements Order (AAO) made on 26 November 2001, the Department dealt with:
Education, other than migrant adult education 
Science Policy
Promotion of collaborative research in science and technology
Training, including New Apprenticeships and training services
Co-ordination of research policy 
Research grants and fellowships
Radioactive waste management

Structure
The Department was an Australian Public Service department, staffed by officials who were responsible to the Minister for Education, Science and Training, Brendan Nelson.

Lisa Paul was appointed the Department's Secretary in October 2004.

References

Ministries established in 2001
Education, Science and Training
2001 establishments in Australia
2007 disestablishments in Australia